The Barunga West Council is a local government area in the Yorke and Mid North region of South Australia. The council seat is at Port Broughton, with a sub-office at Bute.

Description
The council takes its name from the Barunga Range in the eastern part of the council area. The council covers an area in the Mid North and bordering the top of the Yorke Peninsula which includes the towns and localities of Alford, Bute, Clements Gap, Fisherman Bay, Kulpara, Melton, Ninnes, Port Broughton, Thomas Plain, Wokurna and Ward Hill, and parts of Mundoora, Paskeville, South Hummocks, Tickera and Willamulka. The main industries are tourism and growing grain.

History
It was formed in 1997 from the amalgamation of the District Council of Bute and the District Council of Port Broughton. The council boundaries closely follow the boundaries of the six cadastral hundreds of the County of Daly which formed the original local governing bodies in the area in the late 1800s, namely the hundreds of Mundoora and Wokurna (District Council of Mundoora), and the hundreds of Ninnes, Wiltunga, Tickera and Kulpara (District Council of Ninnes).

Councillors

Mayors

 unknown (1997-????)
 Dean Dolling (2011-2013?)
 Cynthia Axford (2014–2018)

References

External links
Council website
 Yorke Peninsula website

Barunga West